"Good Intentions" is a song by Groove Corporation (G/Corp) with vocals by Shara Nelson released as an EP/Single in 1996 on Medicine Records.

Track listing

UK EP/CD Single

 Good Intentions (Edit) 3:50
 Good Intentions (Extended Mix) 5:10
 Faraway Places 5:14
 Return of the Skunk Unlimited Orchestra 3:29

References

External links

1996 EPs
Shara Nelson albums